The 1999 CSKA season was the club's eighth season in the Russian Top Division, the highest tier of association football in Russia.

Squad

Transfers

In:

Out:

Competitions

Top Division

Results by round

Results

Table

Russian Cup

1998-99

1999-2000

The Quarterfinal took place during the 2000 season.

UEFA Champions League

Qualifying rounds

Squad Statistics

Appearances and goals

|-
|colspan="14"|Players out on loan:
|-
|colspan="14"|Players who left CSKA Moscow during the season:

|}

Goal Scorers

Disciplinary Record

References

PFC CSKA Moscow seasons
CSKA Moscow